The 1982 Girabola was the fourth season of top-tier football competition in Angola. Primeiro de Agosto were the defending champions.

The league ran from December 6, 1982, to June 2, 1983, and comprised 14 teams, the bottom three of which were relegated.

Petro de Luanda were crowned champions, winning their 1st title, while Desportivo da Chela, FC do Uíge, Ferroviário da Huíla and Petro do Huambo were relegated.

Osvaldo Saturnino aka Jesus of Petro de Luanda finished as the top scorer with 22 goals.

Changes from the 1981 season
Relegated: Desportivo da Chela, FC do Uíge, Ferroviário da Huíla, Petro do Huambo 
Promoted: Desportivo de Benguela, Inter da Huíla, Inter de Luanda, Sagrada Esperança

Legal claims
In round 14, Construtor do Uíge fielded ineligible player "Finda" (double yellow card) in its away match against Inter de Luanda. Although Construtor had originally won the match 1–0, on account of that, Construtor was awarded a 2–0 defeat.

League table

Results

Season statistics

Top scorers

Most goals scored in a single match

Season statistics

Top scorer
 Osvaldo Saturnino Jesus

Champions

References

External links
Federação Angolana de Futebol

Angola
Angola
Girabola seasons